The Mercedes-Benz "Ponton" series are a range of sedans / saloon car models from Daimler-Benz, introduced starting in 1953, and subsequently nicknamed 'Ponton' (the German word for "pontoon"), referring to its ponton styling, a prominent styling trend that unified the previously articulated hood, body, fenders and runnings boards into a singular, often slab-sided envelope. At the time, Mercedes itself did not refer to any of its cars using the nickname.

Mercedes stretched the 'Ponton' saloons into a range that became the automaker's dominant production models until 1959.

The 1953 Mercedes-Benz W120, marketed as 180, four-cylinder sedans were Mercedes' second totally new series of passenger cars since World War II, following the 1951 introduction of the top of the range W186 Type 300 “Adenauer”, and replaced the pre-war-designed Type 170 and Type 170 S. Contrasting very visibly with the traditional distinct fenders on that body-on-frame model and the ones before it, the 'Pontons' were Mercedes' first monocoque, unitary body production models.

Mercedes expanded the base Ponton model into a diversified line, developing multiple series based on the 180, by introducing more engines and stretching the body. Six-cylinder models received a longer nose, and 'S'-models also a longer passenger compartment, offering more legroom. A six-cylinder coupe and convertible were further derived, and a shortened floorpan of the four-cylinder sedan was also modified to serve as the structure for the Mercedes-Benz 190 SL roadster.

The 'Ponton' saloons were the automaker's main production models until 1959, adding up to 80% of Mercedes-Benz car production between 1953 and 1959, with some models lasting until 1962. The range was succeeded by the range of "Heckflosse" or "Fintail" models.

Design history 
Daimler-Benz emerged from World War II as a carmaker best known in the early 1950s for its expensive Mercedes-Benz 300 Adenauers and  exclusive Mercedes-Benz 300 S sports tourers. Both were largely handbuilt body on frame vehicles. Its low end was anchored by the dated pre-war designed Type 170.

Seeking to expand its production, Mercedes turned toward the unibody concept to design a line of mass-produced cars. Work began in earnest on the pontons bodied cars in 1951, with a design focused on passenger comfort and safety.  Head of the design team was Dr. Fritz Nallinger. Styling was headed by Karl Wilfert. Also in the design team was Béla Barényi, who conceived the passive safety (crash protection) engineering of the body.

The first of the 'Ponton' models to go into production was the 1953 Mercedes-Benz W120,  four-cylinder, four-door sedan, available as the 180 petrol and the 180D diesel. In 1956, the six-cylinder model was expanded into an entire range. The 220a was upgraded to become the 220S. A third saloon series, the Mercedes-Benz W105 was created by grafting the six-cylinder nose onto the shorter center and rear body of the four-cylinder. Fitted with a detuned version of the straight-six, it was sold as the model 219. Additionally, new two-door coupe and convertible bodies were offered for the 220S, on a shortened wheelbase.

In 1956, the four-cylinder model also received an all new, short-stroke  petrol engine option, the 190 (or W121 internally), and in 1957, the old 1.8 litre in the 180 was replaced by a detuned version of the 1.9 litre. In 1958, the base range was further completed by also offering a 1.9 litre diesel.

In 1958, the 220S models were upgraded with fuel injection, and became the Mercedes-Benz W128, or 220SE series. The models 180(D) and 190(D) received further updates in 1959 and 1961.

Designed in safety 
Austrian-Hungarian engineer Béla Barényi originally invented and patented the crumple zone concept in 1937 before he worked for Mercedes-Benz, and in a more developed form in 1952. Barény questioned the prevailing opinion until then, that a safe car had to be rigid. He divided the car body into three sections: the central, rigid, non-deforming passenger compartment, and the crumple zones in the front and the rear. They are designed to absorb the energy of an impact (kinetic energy) by deformation during collision.

The 1953 W120 "Ponton" partially implemented the concepts of crumple zones and the non-deformable passenger cell into its "three-box design"  by having a strong deep platform to form a partial safety cell (patented in 1941). The Mercedes-Benz crumple zones patent (number 854157) granted in 1952, describes the decisive feature of passive safety.  The first Mercedes-Benz car developed, fully using this patent was the 1959 successor, the Mercedes W111 “Tail Fin” Saloon.

The 'Ponton's design concept was proven by ADAC crash test facility in June, 2010 when a Mercedes Ponton was crash tested in their Technical Centre in Landsberg am Lech, confirming the existence of the design incorporated into the vehicle. This made for a milestone in car design with front and rear crumple zones for absorbing kinetic energy on impact.

The safety cell and crumple zones were achieved primarily by the design of the longitudinal members: these were straight in the centre of the vehicle and formed a rigid safety cage with the body panels, whereas the front and rear supports were curved, so they deformed in the event of an accident, absorbing part of the collision energy and preventing the full force of the impact from reaching the occupants.

Models and types

There were essentially five models of Ponton bodies on four different wheelbases: three wheelbase length saloons, plus a coupe and cabriolet version on a shortened six-cylinder body. Note the "D" designates a diesel engine, and the suffix "b" and/or "c" are body variants introduced after the middle of 1959.

 Four-cylinder sedans —  wheelbase
 1953–1962 W120 petrol — 180, 180a, 180b, 180c
 1953–1962 W120 diesel — 180D, 180Db, 180Dc
 1956–1961 W121 — 190, 190b, 190d, 190Db
 Six-cylinder sedan —  wheelbase
 1956–1959 W105 — 219
 Six-cylinder sedans —  wheelbase
 1954–1959 W180 — 220a, 220S
 1958–1960 W128 — 220SE
 Six-cylinder coupés / cabriolets —  wheelbase
 1956–1959 W180 — 220S
 1958–1960 W128 — 220SE

The design of the 190 SL roadster differed completely from the Ponton sedans, copying much of the bodywork of the 300SL sportscar, and using the same suspension, but it was constructed on a shortened version of the W121 Ponton floorpan.

 Four-cylinder roadster with optional hardtop
 1955–1962 R121 — 190 SL

Models and engines timeline

Sample specifications
A 1957 brochure provides a cross section of Ponton models then available:
 Type 180 — , top speed 
 Type 180D — , top speed 
 Type 190 — , top speed 
 Type 219 — , top speed 
 Type 220S — , top speed

References

Notes

Bibliography

  
 
  
 Storz, Alexander Franc. Mercedes-Benz Ponton – vom 180 Diesel bis zum 220 SE Cabriolet 1953 – 1962 ; eine Dokumentation. 1. Auflage, Motorbuch-Verlag, Stuttgart 2011,  (Schrader-Typen-Chronik)

External links 

 Pontons picture
 Ponton Photo Gallery

Ponton
1950s cars
1960s cars